Paul St-Pierre Plamondon (often identified by his initials: PSPP; born February 17, 1977) is a Canadian lawyer, television columnist and politician.

He has been the leader of the Parti Québécois since October 9, 2020. He represents Camille-Laurin in the National Assembly of Quebec.

Education
Paul St-Pierre Plamondon began his college studies at Collège André-Grasset and graduated in 1997.

He holds a BA in Civil and Common Law from McGill University (2001), an MBA from Oxford University (2006), and a Certificate in International Law from Lund University (2001).

Early career 
In 2003, he was a volunteer prosecutor for the Permanent Assembly of Human Rights in Sucre, Bolivia. In 2005, he worked with the North Atlantic Treaty Organization (NATO) in Belgium. St-Pierre Plamondon was also a lawyer in the litigation department of Stikeman Elliott, a national law firm.

In 2009, he joined the Delegatus law firm as vice-president and shareholder of the study. Recognized for his social involvement, St-Pierre Plamondon was awarded the title of Lawyer of the Year in 2010, in the pro bono category, at the annual conference of the Young Bar of Montreal to celebrate the "leaders of tomorrow".

Social and political engagement
In 2007, he co-founded Génération d'idées, a nonprofit thinking group whose mission is to engage young people of 20-35 year-olds in public debate by inviting them to express themselves on social themes in the various platforms of Génération d'idées.

In 2009, with the aim of promoting Génération d'idées and to sound out the opinion of Québec's Generation Y, Paul St-Pierre Plamondon visited 19 Québec cities in 63 days and gathered the thoughts of 500 young people. Following this exercise, he published the essay Des jeunes et l'avenir du Québec: les rêveries d'un promeneur solitaire.

In 2011, he began as co-host of the radio show Génératrice on Radio-Canada’s Première Chaîne. In October 2011, the Génération d’idées group planted more than 250 brooms in front of the National Assembly in Québec City and stepped up public interventions to call for a public inquiry into the construction industry in Québec. Paul St-Pierre Plamondon’s interventions in favour of this commission of inquiry led Radio-Canada to request that he be removed from the program as a co-host.

In 2012, he defended students on walkout in front of the courts and participated in the demonstration of lawyers against Bill 78 (now Bill 12). In September 2013, he resigned as president of Génération d’idées. In February 2014, he became a journalist for Les Affaires newspaper.

In October 2014, he published a second essay entitled Les Orphelins politiques: plaidoyer pour un renouveau du paysage politique québécois, in which he advocated for the emergence of a new movement that would fill the void felt by several political orphans.

Paul St-Pierre Plamondon is the author of several open letters and media interventions on various current issues, including politics.

Parti Québécois (2016–present) 
In 2016, he was a candidate in the 2016 Parti Québécois leadership race, finishing fourth with 6.84% support. One of his main commitments during this race was to reconnect the party with all Québécois.

On October 23, 2016, the leader of the Parti Québécois, Jean-François Lisée, announced the appointment of Paul St-Pierre Plamondon to the position of Special Advisor to the leader of the Parti Québécois, after he had joined the Party. Under the project “Dare to rethink the PQ”, Paul St-Pierre Plamondon’s mandate includes consulting the people of Québec on the renewal of the Party and drafting, at the end of this process, a report and recommendations on the relaunch of the Parti Québécois. The open consultation is particularly aimed at the business community, particularly entrepreneurs and other professionals, members of Québec’s diversity and those under the age of 40. After 162 consultations with more than 3,600 people, it tabled a report with 156 recommendations in April 2017. At the PQ National Congress in September 2017, 44 recommendations were accepted by the PQ National Executive Council. The majority of the other recommendations will finally be adopted at the extraordinary Parti Québécois convention in Trois-Rivières in November 2019.

PQ candidate in the county of Prévost in the 2018 general election, he faces former Liberal minister Marguerite Blais, who now represents the Coalition Avenir Québec. During this local election campaign, Plamondon prioritized the environment, the quality of public services and support for families. Presented as a star contestant, he was defeated by Marguerite Blais.

On January 28, 2020, he officially announced his candidacy for the leadership of the Parti Québécois. Its slogan - OUI - announces a positive and unifying campaign, firmly focused on independence and the celebration of Québec in 2020. Contrary to its constitutional position of 2016, it now promises a popular consultation on independence in a first mandate. As part of this leadership race, he will publish his third essay Rebâtir le camp du OUI where he presents his game plan to revive the Parti Québécois and the idea of sovereignty. He won the leadership race on October 9, 2020 with 56% of the vote in the third round.

In the beginning of 2022, he announced that he would be a candidate in the riding of Camille-Laurin, in Montreal. MNA Richard Campeau, of the Coalition Avenir Québec, has been elected since the last elections in 2018. He won the riding on election night, and his party won a total of 3 seats, down from the last legislature.

During the 2022 Quebec general election he had some controversy with Plamondon's use of the word nègre during a televised debate.

After the election in March 2023, He broke a record for PQ vote of confidences with 98.51% support.

Personal life
St-Pierre Plamondon lives with his wife on Île d'Orléans, near Quebec City. They have two children.

Electoral record

References

1977 births
French Quebecers
Living people
People from Trois-Rivières
Writers from Quebec
Leaders of the Parti Québécois
21st-century Canadian politicians
Parti Québécois MNAs